John McEnroe and Peter Fleming were the defending champions, but McEnroe could not compete this year after facing a two-month suspension due to committing three code violations on his match against Slobodan Živojinović at the US Open. Fleming teamed up with Henri Leconte and lost in the first round to Mark Kratzmann and Laurie Warder.

Miloslav Mečíř and Tomáš Šmíd won the title by defeating Ken Flach and Robert Seguso 7–5, 6–4 in the final.

Seeds

Draw

Draw

References

External links
 Official results archive (ATP)
 Official results archive (ITF)

Wembley Championships
1987 Grand Prix (tennis)